Manchester City Football Club, then known as Ardwick, first entered the Football Alliance in the 1891–92 season. In 1892, the Football League decided to expand, and invited the Alliance clubs to join; having chosen not to apply for entry into the First Division, Ardwick were placed in the newly formed Second Division. In April 1894 Ardwick became Manchester City, following the creation of Manchester City Football Club Ltd. as a limited company.

The club's first team have competed in numerous nationally and internationally organised competitions, and the 500+ players who have played fewer than 25 such matches, either as a member of the starting eleven or as a substitute, are listed below. Each player's details include the duration of his Manchester City career, his typical playing position while with the club, and the number of games played and goals scored in domestic league matches and in all senior competitive matches. Where applicable, the list also includes the national team for which the player was selected, and the number of senior international caps he won while playing for the club. The names are ordered first by number of appearances in total, then by date of debut. A number of players are current members of the first team squad or Elite Development Squad and may go onto to earn further appearances for the club in future.

Key

Name
Players who are currently contracted to Manchester are highlighted in dark blue.
Position
Playing positions are listed according to the tactical formations that were employed at the time. Thus the change in the names of defensive and midfield positions reflects the tactical evolution that occurred from the 1960s onwards. The position listed is that in which the player played most frequently for the club.
Club career
Club career is defined as the first and last calendar years in which the player appeared for the club in any of the competitions listed below, irrespective of how long the player was contracted to the club.
League appearances and League goals
League appearances and goals comprise those in the Football Alliance, the Football League and the Premier League. Appearances in the 1939–40 Football League season, abandoned after three games because of the Second World War, are excluded.
Total appearances and Total goals
Total appearances and goals comprise those in the Football Alliance, Football League (including test matches and play-offs), Premier League, FA Cup, Football League Cup, UEFA Champions League/European Cup, UEFA Europa League/UEFA Cup, FA Community Shield/Charity Shield, Associate Members' Cup, and defunct competitions the UEFA Cup Winners' Cup, Anglo-Italian Cup, Anglo-Italian League Cup, Texaco Cup, Anglo-Scottish Cup and Full Members' Cup. Matches in wartime competitions are excluded.
International selection
Countries are listed only for players who have been selected for international football. Only the highest level of international competition is given.
For players having played at full international level, the caps column counts the number of such appearances during his career with the club.
Last Update
Statistics are correct as of end of 2021–22 season (22 May 2022).

Players with fewer than 25 appearances

See also
List of Manchester City F.C. players (25–99 appearances)
List of Manchester City F.C. players with more than 100 appearances(Also includes winners of the Player of the Year award)

References
General

 Appearances and goals for players whose Manchester City career ended in the 2005–06 season or earlier: 
 Appearances and goals for players whose career continued beyond the 2005–06 season: 
 Playing positions and international recognition for players active before 1939: 
 International caps for players whose career ended in the 1983–84 season or earlier: 
Appearances and goals for players whose Manchester City career ended in the 1990s or earlier; international honours for players active in the 1990s:

Specific

 
Lists of association football players by club in England
Players
Association football player non-biographical articles